The 2003 Champion Hurdle was a horse race held at Cheltenham Racecourse on Tuesday 11 March 2003. It was the 73rd running of the Champion Hurdle.

The race was won by Terry Warner's Rooster Booster, a nine-year-old gelding trained in Somerset by Philip Hobbs and ridden by Richard Johnson. His victory was the first in the race for his owner, trainer and jockey.

Rooster Booster started at odds of 9/2 and won by eleven lengths from Westender, with the favourite Rhinestone Cowboy in third. Hors La Loi III who refused to race and was left at the start, was the only previous winner of the race to line up for the race: other runners included Intersky Falcon, Landing Light and Like-A-Butterfly. Fourteen of the seventeen runners completed the course.

Race details
 Sponsor: Smurfit
 Purse: £300,000; First prize: £174,000
 Going: Good
 Distance: 2 miles 110 yards
 Number of runners: 17
 Winner's time: 3m 54.70

Full result

 Abbreviations: nse = nose; nk = neck; hd = head; dist = distance; UR = unseated rider; PU = pulled up; LFT = left at start

Winner's details
Further details of the winner, Rooster Booster
 Sex: Gelding
 Foaled: 1 April 1994
 Country: United Kingdom
 Sire: Riverwise; Dam: Came Cottage (Nearly A Hand)
 Owner: Terry Warner
 Breeder: Mrs E Mitchell

References

Champion Hurdle
 2003
Champion Hurdle
Champion Hurdle
2000s in Gloucestershire